District 32 of the Texas Senate is an obsolete Senate District. Prior to the 1876 Texas Constitution there had been as many as 33 Senate Districts. District 32 was only active from the Fifth Texas Legislature through the Eleventh Texas Legislature.

District officeholders 

 Senator Scarborough was murdered on October 7, 1862. Senator Hord was sworn in on February 11, 1863

References 

32